Health human resources (HHR) – also known as human resources for health (HRH) or health workforce – is defined as "all people engaged in actions whose primary intent is to enhance positive health outcomes", according to World Health Organization's World Health Report 2006. Human resources for health are identified as one of the six core building blocks of a health system. Human resources for health include physicians, nursing professionals, pharmacists, midwives, dentists, allied health professions, community health workers, social health workers and other health care providers, as well as health management and support functions personnels like cleaner, guard etc. who add important values as part of the wider health systems so that enhance the delivery of essential healthcare services effectively and efficiently. Effective health system functioning highly demand well trained health services managers, medical records and health information technicians, health economists, health supply chain managers, medical secretaries and others. 

The field of health human resources deals with issues such as workforce planning, merit based recruitment, onboarding, training and development, performance management,  promotion, management, retention, human resources for health information management, and research on human resources for health care sector. In recent years, raising awareness of the critical role of HRH in strengthening health system performance and improving population health outcomes has placed the health workforce as one of the highest priorities of global health agenda.

Global situation 

The World Health Organization (WHO) estimates a shortage of almost 4.3 million physicians, midwives, nurses and support workers worldwide. The shortage is most severe in 57 of the poorest countries, especially in sub-Saharan Africa. The situation was declared on World Health Day 2006 as a "health workforce crisis" – the result of decades of underinvestment in health worker education, training, wages, working environment and management. 

Shortages of skilled for health workers are also reported in many specific care areas. For example, there is an estimated shortage of 1.18 million mental health professionals, including 55,000 psychiatrists, 628,000 nurses in mental health settings, and 493,000 psychosocial care providers needed to treat mental disorders in 144 low- and middle-income countries. Shortages of skilled birth attendants in many developing countries remains an important barrier to improving maternal health outcomes. Many countries, both developed and developing, report maldistribution of skilled health workers leading to shortages in rural and underserved areas.

Regular statistical updates on the global health workforce situation are collated by the WHO's Global Health Observatory. However, the evidence base remains fragmented and incomplete, largely related to weaknesses in the underlying human resource information systems (HRIS) within countries.

In order to learn from best practices in addressing health workforce challenges and strengthening the evidence base, an increasing number of HHR practitioners from around the world are focusing on issues such as HHR advocacy, surveillance and collaborative practice. Some examples of global HRH partnerships include:
 Health Workforce Information Reference Group (HIRG)
 Global Health Workforce Network

Research 
Health workforce research is the investigation of how social, economic, organizational, political and policy factors affect access to health care professionals, and how the organization and composition of the workforce itself can affect health care delivery, quality, equity, and costs. 

Many government health departments, academic institutions and related agencies have established research programs to identify and quantify the scope and nature of HHR problems leading to health policy in building an innovative and sustainable health services workforce in their jurisdiction. Some examples of HRH information and research dissemination programs include:

 Human Resources for Health journal
 HRH Knowledge Hub, University of New South Wales, Australia
 Center for Health Workforce Studies, University of Albany, New York
 Canadian Institute for Health Information: Spending and Health Workforce
 Public Health Foundation of India: Human Resources for Health in India
 National Human Resources for Health Observatory of Sudan
 OECD Human Resources for Health Care Study

Policy and planning 
In some countries and jurisdictions, health workforce planning is distributed among labour market participants. In others, there is an explicit policy or strategy adopted by governments and systems to plan for adequate numbers, distribution and quality of health workers to meet health care goals. For one, the International Council of Nurses reports:
The objective of HHRP [health human resources planning] is to provide the right number of health care workers with the right knowledge, skills, attitudes, and qualifications, performing the right tasks in the right place at the right time to achieve the right predetermined health targets.

An essential component of planned HRH targets is supply and demand modeling, or the use of appropriate data to link population health needs and/or health care delivery targets with human resources supply, distribution and productivity. The results are intended to be used to generate evidence-based policies to guide workforce sustainability. In resource-limited countries, HRH planning approaches are often driven by the needs of targeted programmes or projects, for example, those responding to the Millennium Development Goals or, more recently, the Sustainable Development Goals.

The WHO Workload Indicators of Staffing Need (WISN) is an HRH planning and management tool that can be adapted to local circumstances. It provides health managers a systematic way to make staffing decisions in order to better manage their human resources, based on a health worker's workload, with activity (time) standards applied for each workload component at a given health facility.

Global Code of Practice on the International Recruitment of Health Personnel
The main international policy framework for addressing shortages and maldistribution of health professionals is the Global Code of Practice on the International Recruitment of Health Personnel, adopted by the WHO's 63rd World Health Assembly in 2010. The Code was developed in a context of increasing debate on international health worker recruitment, especially in some higher income countries, and its impact on the ability of many developing countries to deliver primary health care services. Although non-binding on the Member States and recruitment agencies, the Code promotes principles and practices for the ethical international recruitment of health personnel. It also advocates the strengthening of health personnel information systems to support effective health workforce policies and planning in countries.

See also 
Health care providers
Health systems
Human resources for health information systems
Human Resources for Health, open access journal
Interprofessional education and collaborative practice in health care
NHS National Workforce Projects, part of the English National Health Service
Physician shortage / Nursing shortage

References

External links 
World Health Organization programme of work on health human resources
Human Resources for Health Databases, Canadian Institute for Health Information
Human resources for health in developing countries – a dossier from the Institute for Development Studies
Compendium of tools and guidelines for HRH situation analysis, planning, policies and management systems 
Online community of practice for HRH practitioners on strengthening health workforce information systems
Human Resources for Health Global Resource Center online collection of HRH research and materials, supported by the IntraHealth International-led CapacityPlus project
HRIS strengthening implementation toolkit 
Africa Health Workforce Observatory

Human resource management
Health care occupations
Global health